Messengers is the second studio album by American metalcore band August Burns Red. It was released on June 19, 2007, through Solid State Records and was produced by the band themselves and Tue Madsen. It is their first release with vocalist Jake Luhrs and bass player Dustin Davidson. It sold 9,000 copies in its first week on sale, and went on to sell over 80,000.

Background 
A video for the song "Composure" was recorded and was released as a single on September 6, 2007. The second video from this album, for the song "Back Burner", premiered on Myspace Music on August 13, 2008. A vinyl copy of this record was also released with limited press numbers through the band's former label, CI Records.

Track listing

Personnel
August Burns Red
 Jake Luhrs – lead vocals, piano
 JB Brubaker – lead guitar
 Brent Rambler – rhythm guitar
 Dustin Davidson – bass guitar, backing vocals
 Matt Greiner – drums, percussions

Additional personnel
 Tue Madsen – producer, mixing
 August Burns Red – producer
 Troy Glessner – mastering
 Jon Dunn – A&R
 Invisible Creature – art direction
 Ryan Clark – design 
 Jerad Knudson – cover photo
 Dave Hill – band photo

References

2007 albums
August Burns Red albums
Solid State Records albums
Albums produced by Tue Madsen